Noises in the Wall is the sixth studio album by American experimental music band Vampire Rodents, released on November 11, 2017 by Rodentia Productions.

Reception
The album received positive write-ups, with reviewers praising the wide scope of musical genres and styles such as the frantic industrial collage of "Good Humour", the eight-minute composition "Cyborghostsex" and Vahnke's interpretation of Schubert's "Piano Trio No. 2". The ten part suite "The Zombie Dolls" was particularly noted for expanding the band's range into cinematic music territory.

Track listing

Personnel
Vampire Rodents
 Daniel Vahnke – sampler, musical arrangements
 Victor Wulf – synthesizer and sampler (17, 35)

Production
 Neil Wojewodzki – mastering, editing

Release history

References

External links 
 Noises in the Wall at Discogs (list of releases)
 Noises in the Wall at Bandcamp

2017 albums
Vampire Rodents albums
Instrumental albums